Drama Queen is Canadian band Neurosonic's debut and only album.  It peaked at number 9 on the Billboard Top Heatseekers album chart.

Track listing
All songs by Jason Darr, except where noted.
"So Many People" - 2:42
"Are Solar" - 3:29
"I Will Always Be Your Fool" - 3:50
"Me Myself And I" (Darr, Peter Karrol) - 4:15
"Crazy Sheila" - 3:10
"Until I Die" - 3:58
"Fearless" - 3:14
"Boneheads" - 4:06
"Frankenstein" - 3:55
"So Now You Know" - 4:32
"For The Boy" - 4:02

Album credits

Musicians
Jason Darr - lead vocals, guitar, bass, piano
Troy Healy - guitar
Mike Wall - bass, backup vocals
Shane Smith - drums
Cassandra Ford - backup vocals

References

2006 debut albums
Neurosonic albums